Niak (also Romanized as Nīāk and Niyāk, Neyāk) is a village in Bala Larijan Rural District, Larijan District, Amol County, Mazandaran Province, Iran. At the 2006 census, its population was 210, in 61 families.  It is located on the Haraz road between Amol and Tehran.

The Seyyed Hasan-e Valli (Seyyed Esmail Allizadeh) shrine is located in the village.

References 

Populated places in Amol County